Kevin Patrick Kiley (born January 30, 1985) is an American politician, attorney, and former educator serving as the U.S. representative for California's 3rd congressional district since 2023. From 2016 to 2022, he represented the 6th district in the California State Assembly. Kiley was a candidate to replace California governor Gavin Newsom in the voter-initiated recall election on September 14, 2021.

Early life, education, and career
Kiley grew up in the Sacramento area, where his father was a physician and his mother was a special education teacher. He attended local public schools, including Cavitt Junior High School and Granite Bay High School, where he was valedictorian.

He graduated with an undergraduate degree from Harvard University in 2007, completing a thesis titled "The Civil Rights Movement and the Reemergence of Classical Democracy". Upon graduation, he became a teacher in Los Angeles through Teach for America, teaching for two years at Manual Arts High School while earning his teaching credentials at Loyola Marymount University. In 2008, he was recognized as a national debate champion while participating as a member of the Loyola debate team.

Kiley later attended Yale Law School, worked as an editor of the Yale Law Journal, and clerked at the Federal Reserve Bank of New York. He returned to California to join the law firm Irell & Manella, where he helped prepare an intellectual property theft case for T-Mobile against Chinese technology company Huawei that was the basis for a federal criminal investigation. He was an adjunct professor at the University of the Pacific McGeorge School of Law.

He resides in Rocklin, California.

Political career
In 2016, Kiley was elected to the California State Assembly. In May 2016, Kiley told The Sacramento Bee that he supported then-Ohio Governor John Kasich in the 2016 United States presidential election. In 2018, Kiley authored legislation to make it easier for students to transfer school districts.

After winning a second term in the State Assembly, Kiley ran for the State Senate in California's 1st District. He finished second in the primary, but lost the runoff to fellow Assemblyman Brian Dahle. Soon after the start of the new legislative session, Kiley introduced legislation to close for private use a controversial DMV office that exclusively catered to state legislators and staff. In a statement to The Sacramento Bee, Kiley said: "This is supposed to be a government of the people, by the people and for the people, not an oligarchy where a gilded political class enjoys privileges that aren’t available to the people that we represent."

According to the Associated Press, Kiley is "a conservative who often flirts with the fringes of the GOP". He has said climate change is real, but opposed Governor Gavin Newsom's executive orders requiring all new vehicles in California to be zero emission by 2035 and banning oil-drilling by 2045. He is a supporter of charter schools. Kiley introduced legislation to ban local and state governments from implementing vaccine requirements. After Joe Biden won the 2020 election and Donald Trump refused to concede while making claims of fraud, Kiley refused to say whether Biden won the 2020 election legitimately. Kiley has said his position is to "stay out of national politics altogether", and that "national politics is a distraction that is used frankly by those in power in Sacramento [as] kind of a smokescreen for their own failures."

2021 California gubernatorial recall election 

Though he voted to authorize $1 billion of emergency pandemic spending for Governor Newsom in March 2020, saying "to trust in Governor Newsom’s leadership and listen to his guidance", Kiley later said Newsom "made a mockery of that trust" and, alongside fellow California legislator James Gallagher, successfully sued in June 2020 to remove Newsom's emergency powers (though the ruling was overturned on appeal), and was influential in the campaign to recall Newsom, publishing a book in January 2021 titled Recall Gavin Newsom: The Case Against America's Most Corrupt Governor.

On July 6, 2021, Kiley announced his candidacy for governor of California in the 2021 recall election. According to the New York Times, he was one of the "more moderate Republican recall candidates," while the Los Angeles Times deemed him and John Cox the "more traditional conservatives" in the election, which failed to remove Newsom from office.

Kiley indicated his support for school choice during the campaign and said teachers' unions in the state were too powerful (with the California Teachers Association having been Newsom's top donor), to students' detriment. Though vaccinated against COVID-19, Kiley pledged to overturn vaccine and mask mandates Newsom implemented if he became governor.

United States Senate vacancies 
In 2020, Kiley urged passage of his bill that would require the potential successor of then-candidate for vice president and Senator Kamala Harris to be elected by California's voters and not appointed by the governor; he reiterated that view during the 2021 gubernatorial recall campaign by pledging to allow voters to pick a replacement for Senator Dianne Feinstein if he became governor and her seat became vacant. Kiley later flagged a constitutional issue with Newsom's appointment of Alex Padilla to replace Harris and Padilla's expected service until January 2023, since the U.S. Constitution stipulates that such appointees serve "until the people fill the vacancies by election".

After lawmakers in the state assembly passed a bill to address the issue that would require voters to select two senators for the same seat—one to serve in the lame-duck session from November 2022 to January 2023 and another for January 2023 to January 2029—Kiley said Newsom should have called a special election to fill Harris's seat much earlier, and that the bill would solve the problem in "the most undemocratic way possible". Newsom eventually signed the bill, which meant California's voters had to vote simultaneously for both the lame-duck Senate seat and the next full Senate term.

U.S. House of Representatives

Elections

2022 

On December 29, 2021, Kiley announced he would run for the U.S. House in California's newly redrawn 3rd congressional district, which includes all or parts of Inyo, Sacramento, Mono, Alpine, El Dorado, Placer, Nevada, Sierra, Yuba, and Plumas counties.

Electoral history
Kiley was elected to serve California's 6th State Assembly district three times: in 2016, 2018, and 2020. He won with 64% of the vote, 58% of the vote, and 59% of the vote, respectively. In 2021, he ran in the California gubernatorial recall as a replacement candidate and got 6th place with 3.5% of the vote.

2016

2018

2020

2021

2022

Works
 Kevin Kiley (2021). Recall Gavin Newsom: The Case Against America's Most Corrupt Governor. .

References

External links 
 
 
 Campaign website
 Kevin Kiley at ballotpedia.org
 Join California Kevin Kiley
 

|-

1985 births
21st-century American politicians
California lawyers
Candidates in the 2021 United States elections
Competitive debaters
Harvard University alumni
Living people
Loyola Marymount University alumni
People from Granite Bay, California
People from Rocklin, California
Republican Party members of the California State Assembly
Republican Party members of the United States House of Representatives from California
Teach For America alumni
Yale Law School alumni